Pararhabdochaeta is a genus of tephritid  or fruit flies in the family Tephritidae.

Species
Pararhabdochaeta albolineata Hardy, 1985
Pararhabdochaeta brachycera (Hardy, 1974)
Pararhabdochaeta convergens (Hardy, 1974)

References

Tephritinae
Tephritidae genera
Diptera of Asia